Lacs d'Étival are two lakes, the small lake (petit lac) and the big lake (grand lac), at Étival in the Jura department of France. The lakes are part of the preserve "Complexe des bois et du lac de l'Assencière" .

References
  

Etival